Prince Mikołaj Krzysztof Radziwiłł (14 August 1695 in Biała Podlaska – 2 June 1715) was a Lithuanian–Polish nobleman.

Mikołaj became Podstoli of Lithuania and starost of Człuchów.

Noble Family
He was the son of Karol Stanisław Radziwiłł and Anna Katarzyna Sanguszko.

Coat of arms
Trąby

1695 births
1715 deaths
Mikolaj Krzysztof